Orlando (1914–2002) and his brothers Cláudio (1916–1998) and Leonardo Villas-Bôas (1918–1961) were Brazilian brothers who worked in indigenous activism. In 1961 they succeeded in getting the entire upper Xingu legally protected, making it the first massive indigenous area in all South America, and the prototype for dozens of similar reserves all over the continent.

Pioneers
The explorer John Hemming wrote that the Villas-Bôas were pioneers in many ways. They were almost the first non-missionaries to live permanently with the natives; and they treated them as their equals and friends. They persuaded tribes to end internecine feuds and unite to confront the encroaching settlement frontier. The Villas-Bôas were the first to appreciate the value of politics and the media in furthering the indigenous cause. They also devised a policy of "change, but only at the speed the Indians want".

Robin Hanbury-Tenison, from Survival International, wrote in 1971 that "The Xingu is the only closed park in Brazil, which means that it is the only area in which Indians are safe from deliberate or accidental contact with undesirable representatives of Western civilization. This is due entirely to the Villas-Bôas brothers and the total dedication of their lives to this work over the last 25 years." Since 1971, more indigenous parks and reserves have been created, such as the Tumucumaque National Park (38,800 km²) in northern Pará state, but the Xingu park (26,400 km²) remains the most important of them.

The anthropologist Shelton Davis wrote that "The Villas-Bôas brothers further argued that it was the responsibility of the federal government to provide a secure protective buffer, in the form of closed Indian parks and reserves, between Indians and the frontiers of national society. In time, the three brothers believed, Indians would integrate into Brazilian national society. This process of integration, however, should be a gradual one and should guarantee the Indians’s survival, ethnic identities and ways of life."

In the foreword of the book Xingu: the Indians, Their Myths the anthropologist Kenneth S. Brecher wrote that

It is now almost 30 years since the Villas-Bôas brothers (...) led the expedition known as 'Brazil's march to the West' which was intended to open up the heart of the interior for colonization. They were overwhelmed by the beauty and cultural richness of the network of Xingu tribes which they discovered, and when the expedition disbanded they remained  in the jungle to protect the Xinguanos from the land speculators, state senators, diamond prospectors, skin hunters, and rubber gatherers who had followed in their wake. (...) That the Xingu tribes continue to exist, in fact to thrive, is due largely to the extreme dedication, intelligence, cunning, and physical strength of these brothers.

Personal lives and deaths
Of the 11 siblings, the three brothers banded together in their pioneering work, later supported by their younger brother Alvaro.

Orlando died in 2002. When a major chief dies, the Xingu Indians hold a great funerary festival (the Kuarup) in his honour. They did this for Orlando even though he was white. He had two sons, Noel and Orlando.

Claudio was born on December 8, 1916 in Botucatu, São Paulo  and died of a stroke in his São Paulo apartment on March 1, 1998. Indians called him "The Father" and by 1994 there were 6000 Indians in 18 settlements from different tribes.

Leonardo died in 1961 at age 43.

Álvaro was born 1926 in São Paulo and worked with his brothers in the Xingu area from 1961-1962. He then settled in São Paulo, where he provided logistical support to his brothers' missions in the country's interior. He assumed the presidency of FUNAI (Fundação Nacional do Índio) for a short period in 1985. Died in Bauru, São Paulo, on August 22, 1995.

Awards and legacy
Two of the Villas-Bôas brothers, Orlando and Cláudio, were jointly awarded the Royal Geographical Society’s gold medal in 1967, as much for their geographical explorations as for their humanitarian work. They also received the GEO prize from the president of Germany, Richard von Weizsäcker and the ex-Chancellor of West Germany Willy Brandt in 1984, in recognition of their humanitarian work. The two were twice nominated for the Nobel Prize for Peace in 1971 and again in 1975.

Matupá Airport, in Matupá, Mato Grosso, Brazil is named after the brother Orlando.

The Villas-Bôas brothers are the main protagonists in Cao Hamburger's 2012 film Xingu.

In April 2014 the Brazilian graffiti artist Speto created an extensive artwork dedicated to the Villas-Bôas titled 3 Brothers on 14 concrete pillars of the elevated metro track of Krieau station in Vienna commissioned by Wiener Linien and KÖR Kunst im öffentlichen Raum. Honoring the brothers' legacy, Speto painted characters from Brazilian mythology like Boitatá, Iara or Boto and tribal pattern designs on the pillars of the subway line. To this end he employed graphic styles of the Brazilian Literatura de Cordel.

See also

 Sydney Possuelo

References

Further reading

 Hemming, John. Die if you must. London: Macmillan, 2003. 

For information about the Villas-Bôas Indian policy, see:
 Davis, Shelton. Victims of the Miracle: development and the Indians of Brazil. New York: Cambridge University Press, 1977 
 Vilas-Boas Filho, Orlando. Orlando Villas-Bôas: expedições, reflexões e registros. São Paulo: Metalivros, 2006
 Cowell, Adrian. The decade of destruction London:  Headway, 1990. 
 Cowell, Adrian. The tribe that hides from man London: Pimlinco, 1995. 
 Cowell, Adrian, The heart of the forest London: Headway, 1970. ASIN B0000CKKX0 OCLC 1724547
 Hemming, John; Huxley, Francis; Feuerst, René; Brooks, Edwin, Tribes of the Amazon Basin in Brazil 1972, Charles Knight & Co. Ltd, London, 1973.
 Leopold of Belgium, Indian Enchantment Nancy: Librarie Hachette, 1967. 
 Menget, Patrick, Au nom des autres: classification des relations sociales chez les Txicao du Haut-Xingu (Brésil), École Pratique des Hautes Études, Sixième Section, 1977.

Selected bibliography

 Villas-Bôas, Orlando. Interview. In: Amazind bulletin 1. Geneva, Switzerland, aut. 1973, p. 25-29.
 Villas-Bôas, Orlando: Os índios na estrada. In: Cadernos da Comissão Pró-Índio: a questão da emancipação. São Paulo, n.1, 1979, p. 87-88.
 Villas-Bôas, Orlando: O índio – ontem, hoje... e amanhã? In: Tassara, Eda; Bisilliat, Maureen: O índio: ontem, hoje, amanhã. São Paulo: Memorial da América Latina/EDUSP, 1991, pp. 48–56.
 Villas-Bôas, Orlando: A arte dos pajés: impressões sobre o universo espiritual do índio xinguano. São Paulo: Editora Globo, 2000.
 Villas-Bôas, Orlando: Senhor. In: Carlos Jacchieri: Carta Brasil 2000 1°Fórum Nacional da Identidade Brasileira. São Paulo: Imprensa Oficial, 2000a, p. 15-20.
 Villas-Bôas, Orlando: Entrevista. In: Mariléia M. Leal Caruso; Raimundo Caruso: Amazônia, a valsa da galáxia: o abc da grande planície. Florianópolis: Editora da UFSC, 2000b, p. 25-44.
 Villas-Bôas, Orlando: Um povo na ignorância de seu passado. In: Aguiar, L. A.; SOBRAL, M. (Orgs.) Para entender o Brasil. São Paulo: Alegro, 2001, p. 265-271.
 Villas-Bôas, Orlando: Discurso proferido na Universidade Federal de Minas Gerais, em 21 de dezembro de 1972.. In: Cristina Müller; Luiz Octávio Lima; Moisés Rabinovici (Orgs.): O Xingu dos Villas-Bôas. São Paulo: Metalivros, 2002, p. 28-29.
 Villas-Bôas, Orlando: Rompendo fronteiras. In: Cristina Müller; Luiz Octávio Lima; Moisés Rabinovici (Orgs.): O Xingu dos Villas-Bôas. São Paulo: Metalivros, 2002a, p. 146-164.
 Villas-Bôas, Orlando: Discurso proferido em 1974, na Universidade Federal do Mato Grosso. In: C. Figueiredo: 100 discursos históricos brasileiros. Belo Horizonte: Editora Leitura, 2003. p. 413-420.
 Villas-Bôas, Orlando: História e causos. São Paulo: FTD, 2005.
 Villas-Bôas, Orlando: Trinta e cinco anos de assistência e pesquisa: a Escola Paulista de Medicina e o Parque Indígena do Xingu. In: Roberto Geraldo Baruzzi; Carmen Junqueira (Orgs.). Parque Indígena do Xingu: saúde, cultura e história. São Paulo: Terra Virgem, 2005a, p. 49-57.
 Villas-Bôas, Cláudio. Saving Brazil's stone age tribes from extinction. In: National Geographic Magazine. Vol. 134. n.o. 3. set. 1968, p. 424-444.
 Villas-Bôas, Cláudio; Villas Bôas, Orlando. "Xingu: Os índios, seus mitos" Rio de Janeiro: Zahar, 1970.
 Villas-Bôas, Cláudio; Villas-Bôas, Orlando. "Xingu: the Indians, their myths" New York: Farrar, Straus and Giroux, 1973. 
 Villas-Bôas, Orlando: Os Juruna no Alto-Xingu”. In: Reflexão. Instituto de Ciências Humanas e Letras da Universidade Federal de Goiás, 1970a. p. 61-87.
 Villas-Bôas, Orlando: Território Tribal. In: Maureen Bisilliat; Orlando Villas Bôas und Claudio Villas Bôas: Xingu: território tribal. São Paulo: Cultura Editores Associados, 1990, p. 13-33.
 Villas-Bôas, Orlando: Memórias de Orlando e Cláudio Villas Bôas. In: Darcy Ribeiro. Carta: falas, reflexões, memórias – informe de distribuição restrita do Senador Darcy Ribeiro. Brasília: Gabinete do Senador Darcy Ribeiro, 1993, vol. 9., p. 187-203.
 Villas-Bôas, Orlando: A marcha para o oeste:  epopéia da Expedição Roncador-Xingu. São Paulo: Editora Globo, 1994.
 Villas-Bôas, Orlando: Almanaque do sertão: histórias de visitantes, sertanejos e índios. São Paulo: Editora Globo, 1997.
 Villas-Bôas, Orlando, Claudio Villas-Bôas, *Alvaro Villas-Bôas: Antigamente o índio nos comia. Agora somos nós que estamos comendo o índio.. In: Revista de Cultura Vozes - Política Indigenista no Brasil. Petrópolis: Vozes: 1976. n. 3, ano 70, p. 209-219.

External links

 Xingu on Berlinale film program
 Xingu film about the brothers

Sibling trios
Brazilian civil rights activists
Explorers of Amazonia
Indigenous rights activists

People from São Paulo (state)